The Metropolis Water Act 1852 was an Act of the Parliament of the United Kingdom which introduced regulation of water supply companies in London ("the Metropolis"), including minimum standards of water quality for the first time.

The Act was enacted in order to "make provision for securing the supply to the Metropolis of pure and wholesome water." Under the Act, it became unlawful for any water company to extract water for domestic use from the tidal reaches of the Thames after 31 August 1855, and from 31 December 1855 all such water was required to be "effectually filtered".

The Metropolis Water Act 1852 was followed by four more Metropolis Water Acts enacted over the next 50 years: the Metropolis Water Act 1871, the Metropolis Water Act 1897, the Metropolis Water Act 1899, and the Metropolis Water Act 1902.

Section 1 of the Metropolis Water Act 1852 was repealed by the Water Act 2003.

Compliance 
The Lambeth Waterworks Company was amongst the first to comply with the act; they were ahead of the act, having decided to move their waterworks to Seething Wells in 1847. The Chelsea Waterworks Company was the last; they relocated in 1856.

See also 
 London water supply infrastructure

References 

United Kingdom Acts of Parliament 1852
Environmental law in the United Kingdom
Water supply and sanitation in London